King Youmiu of Zhao (reigned 235–228 BCE), personal name Zhao Qian, was the penultimate ruler of the state of Zhao during the waning days of the Warring States period of ancient China, although his successor King Jia of Dai only presided over a rump state in Zhao's far north.

The younger son of King Daoxiang of Zhao and Zhao Mianchang, Zhao Qian was nevertheless able to succeed before his elder brother Zhao Jia due to his mother Chang Hou's intervention. He inherited a country that was in danger of being conquered by the Qin state, as it had been since a defeat at the Battle of Changping in 260 BCE.

The state of Zhao, however, was able to survive thanks to the services of General Li Mu, who successfully repelled Qin attempts at exploiting the situation. The Qin devised a scheme to get rid of him; through bribing a close confidante of King Youmiu, the courtier Guo Kai (郭開), Li Mu was arrested and executed on suspicion of treason.

Without Li Mu, Zhao's defenses were unable to resist the might of Qin. In 228 BCE, Qin forces under the leadership of Wang Jian captured the Zhao capital of Handan. King Youmiu surrendered and was then exiled to Fangling (northwestern Hubei).

Notes and references
 Zhao Guo Shi Gao (Draft History of the Zhao State), Shen Changyun, Zhonghua Book Company, China.

Monarchs of Zhao (state)
3rd-century BC Chinese monarchs
Zhao (state)
Zhou dynasty nobility